Al-Taweel (or al-Tawil) is both a given name and a surname. Notable people with the name include:
 al-Taweel of Saudi Arabia (1983-), a princess
 Maher Al-Taweel, a Syrian footballer born in 1982
 Kamal Al Taweel (1922–2003), a musical composer
 Muhammad al-Tawil of Huesca (died 912 or 913), an administrator in what is now Spain
 Issam Al Tawil a Syrian tennis player born in 1989